The Collège-Lycée Léon l'Africain is a French international secondary school in Casablanca, Morocco. It serves the levels collège (junior high school) and lycée (senior high school).

References

External links
 Collège-Lycée Léon l'Africain 

French international schools in Casablanca